John Fahay (June 16, 1902 – January 8, 1980) was a player in the National Football League. He was a member of the Milwaukee Badgers during the 1925 NFL season before playing the following season with the Racine Tornadoes during the 1926 NFL season. That same year he was also a member of the Chicago Bulls of the American Football League. After two years away from professional football, he played with the Minneapolis Red Jackets during the 1929 NFL season.

References

1902 births
1980 deaths
People from Mason City, Illinois
Milwaukee Badgers players
Racine Tornadoes players
Minneapolis Red Jackets players
Chicago Bulls (American football) players
Marquette Golden Avalanche football players